Krapivinsky District is an administrative district (raion), one of the nineteen in Kemerovo Oblast, Russia. As a municipal division, it is incorporated as Krapivinsky Municipal District. It is located in the center of the oblast. Its administrative center is the urban locality (an urban-type settlement) of Krapivinsky. Population:  27,658 (2002 Census);  The population of the administrative center accounts for 30.4% of the district's total population.

References

Notes

Sources

Districts of Kemerovo Oblast